The International Journal of Mathematics was founded in 1990 and is published monthly (with the exception of June and December) by World Scientific. The journal covers mathematics in general.

According to the Journal Citation Reports, the journal has a 2020 impact factor of 0.688.

Abstracting and indexing 
The journal is abstracted and indexed in:

 Science Citation Index
 ISI Alerting Services
 CompuMath Citation Index
 Current Contents/Physical, Chemical & Earth Sciences
 Zentralblatt MATH
 Mathematical Reviews
 CSA Aerospace Sciences Abstracts

Mathematics journals
Publications established in 1990
World Scientific academic journals
English-language journals